The UC compander system (with "UC" derived from Universal Compatible or Universal Compander) is a noise reduction system for vinyl records, aiming at highest playback compatibility even without corresponding UC expander.

Overview
The system was based on the observation that the dynamic range of typical audio source material almost always needs to be reduced in the vinyl mastering process and that very similar system parameters are commonly applied in the process either by the sound engineer or through the hardware. The idea was to develop a compander system loosely emulating this process and to formally standardize on its characteristics. By emulating the typical characteristics of this compression, UC compressed records would not produce acoustical artifacts which would not have been present in similar form on the produced disk anyway, and that thereby they would remain virtually unrecognizable, so that consumption would remain acoustical pleasing and compatible even if records were later played back without UC expander. Initial experiments with a compression factor of 2:1:2 were found to still cause too many artifacts to maintain this compatibility, which led the UC developers to implement a broadband compander utilizing an adaptive compression factor between 1.33:1:1.33 (or 1.67:1:1.67) (at 0 dB) and 1:1 (at −20 dB). In contrast to earlier vinyl disk noise reduction systems such as dbx disc, High-Com II or CX 20, the system deliberately limited the reduced disk noise by about 10 to 12 dB(A) only, an amount similar to what could be achieved by other compander systems where only the receiving side of the medium was exposed to users and therefore the system had to remain playback compatible with a large installed base of devices without corresponding decoder (such as Dolby FM or High Com FM in radio broadcasting).

In fact, the results were found so good that, especially for records produced with Direct Metal Mastering (DMM) (but not exclusively), the system was undocumentedly introduced into the market by the East-German  through record labels such as Amiga,  and Nova since 1983/1984, with UC-encoded records only identifiable by a shy extra "U" engraving in the disk's silent inner groove area. Up to 1990, over 500 UC-encoded titles were produced.

The economical necessities in the former GDR, however, made it impossible to  introduce a suitable UC decoder at the same time. Prototypes of a HMK-D100-based tape recorder with digital counter and UC expander seem to have existed in 1987. The expander was based on a RFT/HFO A274[D], the East-German equivalent to the voltage-controlled electronic potentiometer IC /Philips TCA740[A].

The German reunification and the advances in digital home audio equipment put an end to the further introduction of the system in 1990.

Given the revival of vinyl records, the re-introduction of UC and the development of corresponding compander hardware based on modern semiconductors has been considered several times around 1994/1995 and 2009/2010.

A software decoder for UC has been implemented.

See also
 dbx disc
 CX (Compatible Expansion)
 High-Com II
 RMS, an unrelated tape noise reduction system used in the GDR in the 1980s
 Vinyl disc noise reduction systems

Notes

References

Further reading
   (4 pages)
   (6 pages)
   (3 pages)
  
  
  (NB. Page 736 is missing in the linked PDF.)
 https://web.archive.org/web/20210506190336/http://forum.rft-radio.de/thread.php?threadid=1066

Sound recording
Vinyl disc noise reduction systems